Lora del Río is a city and municipality located in the province of Seville, Spain. According to the 2006 census by INE, it has a population of 19,077 inhabitants.

Geography
The municipality of Lora del Río (Sevilla) is one of 104  municipalities is the province of Sevilla  within  Guadalquivir valley, to the east of Seville, which is about 57 kilometres away.

Notable people
Juan de Cervantes (c. 1380 or 1382 – 25 November 1453) was one of the Catholic Church's cardinals
 Kevin López (born 12 June 1990) was a middle distance runner

References

External links
City info at Junta de Andalucía 
CNT City blogspot 
Instituto Nacional de Estadística 

Municipalities of the Province of Seville